Carving is the act of using tools to shape something from a material by scraping away portions of that material. It may also refer to:

Arts 
Bone carving
Chip carving
Gourd carving or Gourd art
Ice carving or Ice sculpture
Ivory carving
Stone carving
Petroglyph
Vegetable carving
Wood carving
Hobo nickel

Others 
Data carving and/or file carving, two closely related data recovery techniques
Meat carving
Skiing or snowboarding carving style, see carve turn
Carve (video game), a 2004 racing video game
Carved (film), a 2007 Japanese horror film
Carvings (Indiana State Library), a series of bas-relief limestone panels decorating the facade of the Indiana State Library in Indianapolis, Indiana, United States
Carved Records, an American record label
 Carving, a type of Self harm
Seam carving, an image resizing algorithm